The Mended Lute is a 1909 American short silent Western film directed by D. W. Griffith and starring Florence Lawrence. It was produced by the American Mutoscope and Biograph Company.

Cast
 Florence Lawrence – Rising Moon
 Frank Powell – Chief Great Elk Horn
 Owen Moore – Little Bear
 James Kirkwood – Standing Rock
uncredited
 Arthur V. Johnson – Indian
 Alfred Paget – Indian
 Mack Sennett – Indian
 Henry B. Walthall – Indian
 Red Wing – Indian
 James Young Deer – Indian

References

External links
 
 
 The Mended Lute available for free download at Internet Archive

1909 films
1909 Western (genre) films
1909 short films
American black-and-white films
American silent short films
Biograph Company films
Films directed by D. W. Griffith
Silent American Western (genre) films
1900s American films
1900s English-language films